Rewilding may refer to:

Rewilding (conservation biology), the return of habitats to a natural state
Rewilding Europe, a programme to do so in Europe
 Pleistocene rewilding, a form of species reintroduction
Rewilding Institute, an organization concerned with the integration of traditional wildlife and wildlands conservation
Rewilding (anarchism), the reversal of human "domestication"
Rewilding (horse), a thoroughbred racehorse

See also
Species reintroduction, the deliberate release of a species into the wild